Grzegorz Maciej Dolniak (Gizh-eh-gozh Dawl-nee-ak; 17 February 1960 in Będzin – 10 April 2010) was a Polish politician.  He was elected to the Sejm on 25 September 2005, getting 12,151 votes in the 32nd Sosnowiec district as a candidate from the Civic Platform list. He was also a member of Sejm 2001–05.

He was listed on the flight manifest of the Tupolev Tu-154 of the 36th Special Aviation Regiment carrying the President of Poland Lech Kaczyński which crashed near Smolensk-North airport near Pechersk near Smolensk, Russia, on 10 April 2010, killing all aboard.

On 16 April 2010 Dolniak was decorated posthumously with the Commander's Cross of the Order of Polonia Restituta. On 22 April he was buried in the cemetery at Holy Trinity Parish in Będzin. His wife, Barbara, became a politician as well, serving as Deputy Marshal of the Sejm.

See also 
 Members of Polish Sejm 2005–07

References

External links 
 Grzegorz Dolniak – parliamentary page – includes declarations of interest, voting record, and transcripts of speeches.

1960 births
2010 deaths
People from Będzin
Members of the Polish Sejm 2005–2007
Members of the Polish Sejm 2001–2005
Civic Platform politicians
Commanders of the Order of Polonia Restituta
Victims of the Smolensk air disaster
Members of the Polish Sejm 2007–2011